Wilczyński (feminine: Wilczyńska; plural: Wilczyńscy) is a surname of Polish-language origin. It derives either directly from Wilk (meaning "wolf") or from toponyms with this stem (Wilczyn, Wilczyna, Wilczyno). About 17,000 people use the surname in Poland, with the greatest number found in Ostrów Mazowiecka, Dębica, and Kielce. Notable people include:

Ernest Julius Wilczynski (1876–1932), American mathematician
Daniel Wilczynski (born 1956), French footballer
Jan Kazimierz Wilczyński (1806–1885), Polish medical doctor, collector and publisher
Józef Olszyna-Wilczyński (1890–1939), Polish general
Katerina Wilczynski (1894–1978), Polish artist
Konrad Wilczynski (1982), Austrian handball player
Tomasz Wilczyński (1903–1965), bishop of Warmia
Walter Wilczynski (born 1952), American neuroscientist and ethologist
Wojciech Wilczyński (1990), Polish footballer
Taylor Wilczynski (born 1990), Australian rower

References

Surnames
Polish-language surnames